The Open Concurrent Design Server (OCDS) is an initiative of the European Space Agency, ESA. The OCDS aimed to provide the building blocks of a Concurrent, Collaborative and Distributed Engineering for the European Space Industry, using Open Standards Information Models and Reference Libraries.

The OCDS aimed to be the vehicle to distribute ESA's Concurrent Design Facility Concurrent Design methodology and a set of tools to the Space industry, organisations and academia. At the same time it distributes an open data exchange standard for early phase space system engineering and design activities described in ECSS-E-TM-10-25.

The OCDS helps the European Space Community to:
 Increase Data Management Capabilities, including Life Cycle Data Management
 Support the information longevity objective
 Achieve a hardware and software independent solution
 Optimise the design process
 Consolidate Design Models in a repository based on open standards
 Improve communication to Contractors and partners, using Open and publicly available standards (e.g. ISO, ECSS, ....)
 Streamline the communications to other ESA corporate applications using model based integration
 Connect data to product assurance (PA/QA) activities.

Industrial Consortium 
The OCDS has been developed under ESA contract by a Consortium led by DNV with the support of EPMT, Daysha, and Critical as
subcontractors.

Status 

The OCDS development was abandoned, the software was never used in production. The development was redirected to a new development called Open Concurrent Design Tool (OCDT).

References

External links 
 ESA CDF website
 CDF published reports
 RHEA Group
 DNV
 EPMT
 Daysha
 Critical
 ECSS
European Space Agency